Hungary returned to the Eurovision Song Contest 2005, held in Kyiv, Ukraine, after seven years of absence, with the song "Forogj, világ!", written by Attila Valla and composed by Szabolcs Harmath and performed by Nox. The Hungarian entry to the 2005 contest was determined via a national final organised by the Hungarian national broadcaster MTV. Eurovíziós Dalfesztivál took place on 13 March 2005 and featured twelve entries, of which Nox was selected by a combination of jury and televoting to represent Hungary in Kyiv. 

Due to skipping the 2004 contest, Hungary was drawn to compete in the semi-final of the Eurovision Song Contest 2005 which took place on 19 May 2005. Performing during the show in position 15, "Forogj, világ!" was announced among the top 10 entries of the semi-final and therefore qualified to compete in the final. In the final, Hungary placed twelfth with 97 points. It was later revealed that the country placed fifth in the semi-final with a total of 167 points.

Background 

The country previously attempted to enter the contest for the first time in 1993, but did not advance from a special qualifying round held in Ljubljana, Slovenia. To this point, the country's best results had been fourth, achieved in 1994, with the song "Kinek mondjam el vétkeimet?" performed by Friderika Bayer. The Hungarian national broadcaster,  Magyar Televízió (MTV), broadcasts the event within Hungary and organises the selection process for the nation's entry. MTV confirmed their intentions to participate at the 2005 Eurovision Song Contest on 9 December 2003, after previously intending to enter in 2004.

Before Eurovision

Eurovíziós Dalfesztivál 
Eurovíziós Dalfesztivál was the national final format developed by MTV in order to select Hungary's entry for the Eurovision Song Contest 2005. The event took place on 13 March 2005 and featured twelve entries, from which the winner was determined over two rounds of voting.

Competing entries 
MTV received 37 entries during a submission period. A five-member jury evaluated the received submissions and the twelve selected artists and songs were announced on 9 March 2005.

Final 
The final was held on 13 March 2005, organised by MTV and hosted by Tünde Nagy. Twelve songs competed and the winner was chosen in two rounds of voting. In the first round, a public televote selected the top four songs which proceeded to the second round, the superfinal. In the superfinal, the winner was selected by a five-member jury panel who each assigned scores to each superfinalist ranging from 1 to 10.

At Eurovision
According to Eurovision rules, all nations with the exceptions of the host country, the "Big Four" (France, Germany, Spain and the United Kingdom) and the ten highest placed finishers in the 2004 contest are required to qualify from the semi-final on 19 May 2005 in order to compete for the final on 21 May 2005; the top ten countries from the semi-final progress to the final. On 22 March 2005, a special allocation draw was held which determined the running order for the semi-final and Hungary was set to perform in position 15, following the entry from Romania and before the entry from Finland.

Semi-final 
Nox took part in technical rehearsals on 13 and 15 May, followed by dress rehearsals on 18 and 19 May. The Hungarian performance featured lead vocalist Szilvia Péter Szabó dressed all in black, with the rest of the band performing a traditional Hungarian folk dance for the entirety of the performance.

At the end of the show, Hungary was announced among the top 10 entries in the semi-final and therefore qualified to compete in the final. It was later revealed that Hungary placed fifth in the semi-final, receiving a total of 167 points.

Final
Shortly after the semi-final, a winners' press conference was held for the ten qualifying countries. As part of this press conference, the qualifying artists took part in a draw to determine the running order position in which they would perform in for the final.

Nox once again took part in dress rehearsals prior to the final and performed a repeat of their semi-final performance during the final on 21 May. Hungary placed twelfth in the final, scoring 97 points. This was, at the time, Hungary's second best result since the country's debut appearance in 1994.

Voting 

In line with the voting system in place at the time, the Hungarian voting results for the Eurovision Song Contest 2005 were determined via 100% public televoting from viewers across Hungary. In the semi-final, the country awarded its twelve points to Poland, while in the final, Hungary awarded maximum twelve points to eventual winners of the contest, Greece. In the semi-final, Nox also received the maximum twelve points from Poland, the highest mark awarded to the band in the contest.

Points awarded to Hungary

Points awarded by Hungary

References

2005
Countries in the Eurovision Song Contest 2005
Eurovision